Wharton Furnace is an historic iron furnace located at Wharton Township, Fayette County, Pennsylvania, United States. It was built as a blast furnace, placed in blast in 1839 and went out of blast by 1850. It was built by Congressman Andrew Stewart (1791-1872).

It was added to the National Register of Historic Places in 1991.

References

Industrial buildings and structures on the National Register of Historic Places in Pennsylvania
Industrial buildings completed in 1837
Buildings and structures in Fayette County, Pennsylvania
Blast furnaces in the United States
National Register of Historic Places in Fayette County, Pennsylvania